Porn Wikileaks was a wiki website which contained the personal information, including the real names, of over 15,000 pornographic actors. The information came from a patient database managed by AIM Medical Associates which has closed due to the lawsuits caused by the leaks, a clinic where many pornographic film performers were tested for sexually transmitted diseases.

The website received criticism from performers such as Kimberly Kane who stated, "Most of us in the porn industry know who is behind Porn WikiLeaks; he is doing it out of hatred for a business that shunned him for being even too repugnant for porn." Adult performer Christian XXX stated, "They posted my real name, the real names of my parents and pictures of them, their home address and telephone number, the name and picture and phone number of my brother, a picture of the cemetery where my grandfather recently passed away, not to mention saying that I have HIV."

In August 2019, Porn Wikileaks was purchased by Bang Bros, who shut it down; Bang Bros subsequently posted a video of a pile of hard drives  being set on fire.

References

Cyberbullying
American erotica and pornography websites
MediaWiki websites
Internet properties established in 2010
Internet properties disestablished in 2019
Internet vigilantism
Privacy controversies and disputes